The 2008 Yonex All England Super Series is the 98th edition of the All England Open Badminton Championships and also the third tournament of the 2008 BWF Super Series. It was held from 4 to 9 March 2008 in Birmingham, England.

Finals

Men's singles

Seeds
 Lin Dan     
 Lee Chong Wei
 Bao Chunlai
 Chen Jin
 Kenneth Jonassen
 Sony Dwi Kuncoro
 Taufik Hidayat
 Peter Gade

Section 1

Section 2

Women's singles

Seeds
 Xie Xingfang
 Zhang Ning
 Lu Lan
 Zhu Lin
 Wang Chen
 Pi Hongyan
 Xu Huaiwen
 Wong Mew Choo

Section 1

Section 2

Doubles

Seeds

Men's doubles
 Fu Haifeng / Cai Yun
 Markis Kido / Hendra Setiawan
 Koo Kien Keat / Tan Boon Heong
 Choong Tan Fook / Lee Wan Wah
 Candra Wijaya /  Tony Gunawan
 Jung Jae-sung / Lee Yong-dae
 Jens Eriksen / Martin Lundgaard Hansen
 Luluk Hadiyanto / Alvent Yulianto

Women's doubles
 Zhang Yawen / Wei Yili
 Yang Wei / Zhang Jiewen
 Du Jing / Yu Yang
 Lee Kyung-won / Lee Hyo-jung
 Gao Ling / Zhao Tingting
 Chien Yu Chin / Cheng Wen-Hsing
 Kumiko Ogura / Reiko Shiota
 Gail Emms	/ Donna Kellogg

Mixed doubles
 Zheng Bo / Gao Ling
 Nova Widianto / Lilyana Natsir
 Flandy Limpele / Vita Marissa
 Xie Zhongbo / Zhang Yawen
 He Hanbin	/ Yu Yang
 Lee Yong-dae / Lee Hyo-jung
 Sudket Prapakamol / Saralee Thungthongkam
 Nathan Robertson / Gail Emms

Semi-finals

References

All England Open Badminton Championships
All England
2008 in English sport
Sports competitions in Birmingham, West Midlands
March 2008 sports events in the United Kingdom